Armanon Ka Balidaan-Aarakshan is an Indian political thriller television series aired on Imagine TV. The show was set during the period of the Mandal Commission protests of 1990. The show garnered controversy for airing promos containing political violence.

References

External links
 Armanon Ka Balidaan at iBollyTV

Imagine TV original programming
Indian television soap operas
2010 Indian television series debuts
2011 Indian television series endings
Indian political television series
Political thriller television series
Works about reservation in India
Television series set in the 1990s